The tactical diameter of a ship is the distance:
 travelled on sea surface
 during a turning circle test
 with maximum rudder angle
 by the center of gravity of a ship
 taken perpendicular to the initial track followed at approach speed
 when the heading has changed by 180°

The ratio of the tactical diameter divided by the ship's length between perpendiculars gives a dimensionless parameter which can be used to compare ships maneuverability.

External links
http://ittc.sname.org/new%20recomendations/pdf%20Procedures%202008/7.5-04-02-01.pdf

Marine engineering